Marmalade Dog is an annual gaming convention operated by the Western Michigan Gamers Guild (WMGG) and held on the campus of Western Michigan University in Kalamazoo, Michigan each spring.

Marmalade Dog is traditionally held in The Bernhard Center (WMU's student union).  Exceptions to this were in 1999 (Sangren Hall), 2002 (Ellsworth Cafeteria) and 2006 (Student Recreation Center).

Name 
The distinctive name for the convention was given a brief explanation in the 1994 pre-registration book:

The name was actually suggested by John Zimmerman (Guild Librarian around the time of the first Marmalade Dog): 

Prior to 1994 the WMGG was known as the "Western Area Role-Players" and the convention called "WARPCon".

Logos 
The original Marmalade Dog logo was also created by John Zimmerman.  This illustration was used to brand and promote Marmalade Dog up to and including the 1999 convention.  It was at this convention (Marmalade Dog 4) that professional fantasy artist Jeff Easley drew a rendition of Marmalade Dog which he gave to the WMGG.

While the Easley illustration did become the new "official" Marmalade Dog, the classic logo was still used on some convention materials until 2001 and after that on certain WMGG materials.  Most recently the Zimmerman dog was used as a repeating pattern on the WMGG photo ID membership cards issued 2005–present.

A new vision of Marmalade Dog has been created for nearly every convention since Marmalade Dog II, however it was not until Mia Paluzzi's illustration for Marmalade Dog 7 in 2002 that all convention materials (web site, books, badges, T-shirts, etc.) began to exclusively use the annually changing image.

Timeline 
1994
 Marmalade Dog: Gamefest 94, January 15–16, Special Guests: Troy Denning and Greg Costikyan
1995
 Marmalade Dog Gamefest II, October 1–2, Special Guest: Sam Chupp
1996
 Marmalade Dog III Gamefest, March 9–10, Special Guest: Bill Slavicsek. 
1999
 Marmalade Dog 4, March 27, Special Guest: Jeff Easley
2000
 Marmalade Dog 5 Gamefest, April 1, Special Guest: Tom Wham
2001
 Marmalade Dog 6: Gamefest 2001, March 31 - April 1
2002
 Marmalade Dog 7: Gamefest 2002, March 23–24
2003
 Marmalade Dog 8: Gamefest 2003, March 29–30
2004
 Marmalade Dog 9: Gamefest 2004, April 2–4
2005
 Marmalade Dog 10: Gamefest 2005, March 11–13
2006
 Marmalade Dog 11, March 24–26
2007
 Marmalade Dog 12, March 16–18
2008
 Marmalade Dog 13, March 28–30
2009
 Marmalade Dog 14, January 30 - February 1
2010
 Marmalade Dog 15, March 26–28
2011
 Marmalade Dog 16, April 15–17
2012
 Marmalade Dog 17, February 24–26
2013
 Marmalade Dog 18, February 8–10
2014
 Marmalade Dog 19, February 7–9
2015
 Marmalade Dog 20, February 6–8
2016
 Marmalade Dog 21, March 18–20
2017
 Marmalade Dog 22, March 24–26
2018
 Marmalade Dog 23, March 30 - April 1
2019
 Marmalade Dog 24, February 22–24
2022
 Marmalade Dog 25, March 11–13

References

External links 
http://www.marmaladedog.org/ - The Marmalade Dog website.
http://www.wmgg.org/ - The Western Michigan Gamers Guild website.

Gaming conventions
Western Michigan University